was a Japanese racing driver.

Career 
Born in Odawara, Kanagawa Prefecture, Japan, Hagiwara was a graduate of the Tokai University in Tokyo. He started his racing career at age 21, driving a Nissan Sunny, and eventually progressed to the Japanese Formula 3 championship finishing fourth in 1980 and runner-up in 1981. After a season spent in the JAF Pacific Series, Hagiwara embarked on a full-time campaign in the Japanese Formula 2 championship alongside sporadic appearances in the All Japan Endurance Championship, racing alongside Kazuyoshi Hoshino. In 1985, Hagiwara, Hoshino, and Keiji Matsumoto became the first Japanese drivers to ever win a race in the World Sportscar Championship; Hoshino was actually the only one who got to drive the car before the race was stopped early due to heavy rain.

Death 
Hagiwara was killed during a private testing session at Sportsland SUGO on Monday, 7 April 1986. Piloting a Mercedes-Benz 190E 2.3-16V operated by Leyton House Racing, Hagiwara crashed in Turn 2 (now called Rainbow Corner). The car then engulfed in flames, trapping the 29-year-old driver inside.

Originally, Hagiwara was not supposed to test on Monday as he had entered the opening race of the All Japan Endurance Championship held on Sunday, 6 April 1986 (the International Suzuka 500km held at Suzuka Circuit). However, the Nissan R86V, which was scheduled to race in Suzuka, suffered from a mechanical problem during free practice and was unable to participate in the race. Hagiwara thus changed his schedule and headed for Sportsland SUGO which led to the fateful testing session.

After his death, Aguri Suzuki was chosen to replace Hagiwara for the 1986 24 Hours of Le Mans in the #23 Nissan R86V entry.

Racing record

Japanese Top Formula Championship results
(key) (Races in bold indicate pole position) (Races in italics indicate fastest lap)

References 

http://afw.fc2web.com/ziko/ziko1980.htm

1956 births
1986 deaths
Japanese racing drivers
Racing drivers who died while racing
Sport deaths in Japan
People from Kanagawa Prefecture
Sportspeople from Kanagawa Prefecture
People from Odawara

Japanese Sportscar Championship drivers